The Greek Senate (Gerousia) was the upper chamber of the parliament in Greece, extant several times in the country's history.

Local senates during the War of Independence
During the early stages of the Greek War of Independence, prior to the establishment of a centralized administration, a number of regional councils were established, most of which were termed "senate", but which were unicameral bodies: the Senate of Western Continental Greece, the Areopagus of Eastern Continental Greece (sometimes referred to as "senate"), and the Peloponnesian Senate.

1829–1833

A unicameral body with purely advisory functions, the Senate was established in 1829 by the Fourth National Assembly at Argos in replacement of the Panellinion, established the previous year. It had 27 members, 21 of whom were chosen by the Governor (Ioannis Kapodistrias) from 63 candidates nominated by the Assembly, and further six who were appointed directly by the Governor. Georgios Sisinis was elected as its president. After Kapodistrias' murder in 1831, the Senate appointed a series of governing councils to lead the state. In 1832, the Fifth National Assembly at Nafplion abolished the Senate, but the Senate refused to recognize the act, and survived until the arrival of King Otto in February 1833.

1844–1864
The Senate as an upper chamber was established by the Greek Constitution of 1844. The Senate had 27 members, appointed for life by the King, who in addition could appoint further members up to one half of the statutory number. The Senate, seen as a reactionary body and essentially dependent upon the King, was abolished by the Greek Constitution of 1864.

1927–1935

On 2 January 1924, the Fourth National Assembly convened and decided the abrogation of the dynasty as well as the abolition of the crowned democracy (a decision which was ratified by referendum on 13 April 1924), establishing the Second Hellenic Republic.

Whilst the Fourth Constitutional Assembly was working towards the completion of the new Constitution, the coup d'état of General Theodoros Pangalos took place. After the fall of his dictatorship in 1926, the "Parliament of the First Term" was elected, which, finally, voted through the Constitution of 1927.

Legislative power was exercised by the Chamber of Deputies and the Senate. The Chamber was made up of 200-300 members elected for a four-year term by direct, secret and universal ballot. The Senate was composed of 120 members elected for a nine-year term, but its synthesis was renewed every three years by 1/3. At least 9/12 of the senators were elected by the people, 1/12 by the Chamber and the Senate in a common session at the onset of each parliamentary term, whereas the remaining 2/12 were elected on the basis of a principle of representation of the professions.

In the event of disagreement between the two houses in the voting of a law, the Constitution established the supremacy of the Chamber's vote.

Another significant element was the explicit institution of the parliamentary system. For the first time, the Greek Constitution included a clause stating that the Cabinet must "enjoy the confidence of the Parliament".

The Second Hellenic Republic lasted until 1935. The Constitution of 1927 was abolished, the Constitution of 1911 was re-instated, and King George II came back to the throne by a referendum.

Ionian Senate 

Although not a part of the Kingdom of Greece, there was also an upper house called the Ionian Senate in the Septinsular Republic (1800-1815) and United States of the Ionian Islands (1815-1864), under Russian, French and British Protectorates. During most of its history it was housed at the Palace of St. Michael and St. George in Corfu, where its meeting room can still be seen with the original furniture. The six chairs are for its six members:
 the President of the Senate
 one delegate for each of the major four islands (Corfu, Lefkada, Kefalonia and Zakynthos)
 one delegate rotating between the minor three (Paxi, Ithaca and Kythira)

References

 
1829 establishments in Greece
1832 disestablishments
1844 establishments in Greece
1864 disestablishments
1927 establishments in Greece
1935 disestablishments
Greece
Political history of Greece
Defunct upper houses
Ioannis Kapodistrias